LA most frequently refers to Los Angeles, the second largest city in the United States.

La, LA, or L.A. may also refer to:

Arts and entertainment

Music
 La (musical note), or A, the sixth note
 "L.A.", a song by Elliott Smith on Figure 8 (album)
 L.A. (EP), by Teddy Thompson
 L.A. (Light Album), a Beach Boys album
 "L.A." (Neil Young song), 1973
 The La's, an English rock band
 L.A. Reid, a prominent music producer
 Yung L.A., a rapper
 Lady A, an American country music trio
 "L.A." (Amy Macdonald song), 2007
 "La", a song by Australian-Israeli singer-songwriter Old Man River

Other media
 l(a, a poem by E. E. Cummings
 La (Tarzan), fictional queen of the lost city of Opar (Tarzan)
 Lá, later known as Lá Nua, an Irish language newspaper
 La7, an Italian television channel
 LucasArts, an American video game developer and publisher
 Liber Annuus, academic journal

Business, organizations, and government agencies 
 L.A. Screenings, a television market
 LATAM Chile, formerly LAN Airlines (IATA code)
 Lavochkin, a Russian design bureau
 Lawrence Academy at Groton, an American boarding school
 Lebanese Army, the military of the Republic of Lebanon
 Library Association, now called the Chartered Institute of Library and Information Professionals
 Linux Australia
 Local authority, a unit of government in the United Kingdom
 London Assembly
 Loyola Academy, an American college preparatory high school

Language 
 Latin, by ISO 639-1 language code
 La (Javanese) (ꦭ), a syllabic in the Javanese abugidic script
 la, a form of the definite article in many Romance languages

Places

Europe
 Lancaster, a city in northwest England 
 LA postcode area, northwest England (area name derived from city of Lancaster)
 Landeck District, Austria (LA on vehicle license plates)
 Long Ashton, North Somerset, England

North America
 Latin America
 Los Altos (disambiguation), various places
 Louisiana, a state in the United States (postal abbreviation: LA)
 Lethbridge, Alberta, Canada
 Lower Alabama (South Alabama and Northwest Florida)
 Lewiston–Auburn, twin cities in the US state of Maine

Elsewhere
 Los Ángeles (disambiguation), several places in Latin countries
 Laos (by ISO 3166-1 country code)
 .la, its top-level domain
 Las Anod, a city in Khatumo and Somalia
 Latin America
 La, Ghana, a town in La Dade Kotopon Municipal District, Greater Accra Region
 Lubuk Alung railway station, West Sumatra, Indonesia

Science, technology, and mathematics

Biology, biochemistry, and medicine
 La (genus), a genus of moths
 Lauric acid, a saturated fatty acid
 Lewis acids and bases, literature abbreviation
 Linoleic acid, a fatty acid
 Lipoic acid, an organosulfur compound
 Lupus anticoagulant, an autoimmune disorder
 Local anesthetic, in medicine

Computing
 Load average, a measure of the amount of computational work that a computer system performs

Other uses in science, technology, and mathematics
 Lanthanum, symbol La, a chemical element
 Laser ablation, a technique of removing material from a surface by irradiating it with a laser beam
 Linear algebra, a branch of mathematics

Other uses 
 Landscape architecture, the design of outdoor structures 
 Language arts, an educational subject
 Legislative assistant, a rôle on a legislator's staff

People with the given name, La 
 La David Johnson (1992–2017), United States Army Sergeant
 LaBradford Smith (born 1969), American basketball player

Vessels of the United States Navy 
 Los Angeles-class submarine, a boat class

See also 
 La La (disambiguation)
 Los Angeles (disambiguation)